The 2019 WNBA season was the 20th season for the Seattle Storm of the Women's National Basketball Association. The regular season began on May 25 with a game against the Phoenix Mercury.

On August 15, 2018 the Seattle Storm announced that they would play their regular season games at the University of Washington's Alaska Airlines Arena while KeyArena undergoes renovations for the Seattle Kraken of the NHL. The Storm will play five games at the Angel of the Winds Arena in Everett, Washington.

During the preseason, two of the Storm's prominent stars were injured.  Breanna Stewart, the 2018 WNBA MVP, ruptured her Achilles tendon while playing in the EuroLeague for Dynamo Kursk.  Stewart underwent surgery, and is expected to recover in time for the 2020 season, but miss the entirety of 2019. Sue Bird underwent arthroscopic surgery to remove a loose body in her left knee and would miss the entire 2019 season.  Bird was selected to the All Star Game in 2018, and was the team leader in assists.

For the first six games of the season, the Storm alternated winning a game and losing a game.  Through the month of June, they could not win more than two games in a row, and finished June with an 8–6 record.  July was a streak filled month, with the team winning four games in a row, after starting the month with two home losses to Atlanta Dream and New York Liberty.  The Dream and Liberty ended up having the worst records in the WNBA.  However, they finished the month with a 12–9 overall record, and an eye toward a playoff berth.  August proved difficult as the team went 3–6 during the month.  The month ended on a high note when they secured a playoff berth on August 29.  They finished the season strong, going 3–1 in September to lock up the number six playoff seed.

As the #6 seed, Seattle hosted the #7 seed Minnesota Lynx in the first round of the playoffs.  The Storm were able to advance to the second round with a ten point win.  In the second round, the #3 seeded Los Angeles Sparks proved to be too much for the Storm, and their season ended with a twenty three point loss at the Staples Center.

Transactions

WNBA Draft

Trades and roster changes

Roster

Game log

Preseason 

|- style="background:#fcc;"
| 1
| May 15
| Phoenix Mercury
| L 84–87
| Tied (15)
| Tied (7)
| Canada (5)
| Angel of the Winds Arena3,076
| 0–1
|- style="background:#fcc;"
| 2
| May 17
| @ Los Angeles Sparks
| L 85–92
| Canada (18)
| Russell (9)
| Canada (6)
| Hutto-Patterson GymN/A
| 0–2

Regular season

|- style="background:#cfc;"
| 1
| May 25
| Phoenix Mercury
| W 77–68
| Howard (21)
| Howard (16)
| Canada (6)
| Angel of the Winds Arena8,500
| 1–0
|- style="background:#fcc;"
| 2
| May 29
| @ Minnesota Lynx
| L 61–72
| Howard (18)
| Tied (5)
| Canada (4)
| Target Center8,092
| 1–1
|- style="background:#cfc;"
| 3
| May 31
| @ Atlanta Dream
| W 82–66
| Howard (19)
| Howard (14)
| Canada (7)
| State Farm Arena2,119
| 2–1

|- style="background:#fcc;"
| 4
| June 1
| @ Chicago Sky
| L 79–83
| Howard (21)
| Howard (9)
| Canada (6)
| Wintrust Arena7,063
| 2–2
|- style="background:#cfc;"
| 5
| June 4
| Minnesota Lynx
| W 84–77
| Loyd (19)
| Howard (6)
| Canada (7)
| Angel of the Winds Arena5,711
| 3–2
|- style="background:#fcc;"
| 6
| June 9
| @ Chicago Sky
| L 71–78
| Tied (20)
| Tied (6)
| Canada (5)
| Wintrust Arena5,032
| 3–3
|- style="background:#cfc;"
| 7
| June 11
| @ Indiana Fever
| W 84–82
| Howard (26)
| Howard (9)
| Tied (6)
| Bankers Life Fieldhouse3,506
| 4–3
|- style="background:#cfc;"
| 8
| June 14
| @ Washington Mystics
| W 74–71
| Howard (19)
| Tied (11)
| Clark (5)
| St. Elizabeth's East Arena3,654
| 5–3
|- style="background:#fcc;"
| 10
| June 16
| @ Connecticut Sun
| L 67–81
| Howard (20)
| Howard (8)
| Tied  (3)
| Mohegan Sun Arena7,773
| 5–4
|- style="background:#cfc;"
| 11
| June 21
| Los Angeles Sparks
| W 84–62
| Loyd (23)
| Clark (10)
| Tied (3)
| Angel of the Winds Arena6,114
| 6–4
|- style="background:#cfc;"
| 12
| June 23
| Indiana Fever
| W 65–61
| Loyd (21)
| Tied (6)
| Howard (4)
| Alaska Airlines Arena7,211
| 7–4
|- style="background:#fcc;"
| 12
| June 25
| @ Las Vegas Aces
| L 56–60
| Howard (14)
| Howard (12)
| 3 tied (3)
| Mandalay Bay Events Center4,215
| 7–5
|- style="background:#cfc;"
| 13
| June 28
| Chicago Sky
| W 79–76
| Canada (17)
| Howard (9)
| Tied (3)
| Alaska Airlines Arena7,915
| 8–5
|- style="background:#fcc;"
| 14
| June 30
| Phoenix Mercury
| L 67–69
| Whitcomb (13)
| Howard (8)
| Howard (5)
| Alaska Airlines Arena8,002
| 8–6

|- style="background:#fcc;"
| 15
| July 3
| New York Liberty
| L 83–84
| Russell (19)
| Clark (9)
| Canada (7)
| Alaska Airlines Arena8,710
| 8–7
|- style="background:#fcc;"
| 16
| July 5
| Atlanta Dream
| L 66–77
| Howard (20)
| Russell (9)
| Whitcomb (5)
| Alaska Airlines Arena8,111
| 8–8
|- style="background:#cfc;"
| 17
| July 12
| Dallas Wings
| W 95–81
| Mosqueda-Lewis (18)
| Russell (8)
| Canada (12)
| Alaska Airlines Arena6,451
| 9–8
|- style="background:#cfc;"
| 18
| July 14
| New York Liberty
| W 78–69
| Langhorne (19)
| Canada (9)
| Canada (8)
| Alaska Airlines Arena6,733
| 10–8
|- style="background:#cfc;"
| 19
| July 17
| @ Minnesota Lynx
| W 90–79
| Howard (33)
| Russell (9)
| Whitcomb (8)
| Target Center8,403
| 11–8
|- style="background:#cfc;"
| 20
| July 19
| Las Vegas Aces
| W 69–66
| Howard (21)
| Howard (10)
| Canada (4)
| Alaska Airlines Arena9,000
| 12–8
|- style="background:#fcc;"
| 21
| July 23
| @ Las Vegas Aces
| L 62–79
| Tied (13)
| Howard (10)
| Clark (4)
| Mandalay Bay Events Center5,193
| 12–9

|- style="background:#fcc;"
| 22
| August 2
| Washington Mystics
| L 79–99
| Howard (26)
| 3 tied (6)
| Canada (6)
| Angel of the Winds Arena7,488
| 12–10
|- style="background:#fcc;"
| 23
| August 4
| @ Los Angeles Sparks
| L 75–83
| Tied (16)
| Russell (9)
| Howard (5)
| Staples Center12,820
| 12–11
|- style="background:#cfc;"
| 24
| August 8
| Dallas Wings
| W 69–57
| Howard (23)
| Howard (11)
| Canada (6)
| Angel of the Winds Arena6,268
| 13–11
|- style="background:#cfc;"
| 25
| August 11
| @ New York Liberty
| W 84–69
| Clark (21)
| Tied (8)
| Russell (6)
| Barclays Center7,715
| 14–11
|- style="background:#fcc;"
| 26
| August 14
| @ Washington Mystics
| L 59–88
| Howard (24)
| Howard (8)
| Howard (4)
| St. Elizabeth's East Arena3,917
| 14–12
|- style="background:#fcc;"
| 27
| August 16
| @ Connecticut Sun
| L 78–79
| Howard (27)
| Howard (10)
| 3 tied (4)
| Mohegan Sun Arena7,092
| 14–13
|- style="background:#cfc;"
| 28
| August 18
| Minnesota Lynx
| W 82–74
| Canada (14)
| Tied (6)
| Canada (6)
| Alaska Airlines Arena9,000
| 15–13
|- style="background:#fcc;"
| 29
| August 25
| Indiana Fever
| L 54–63
| Howard (14)
| Howard (9)
| Howard (5)
| Alaska Airlines Arena8,076
| 15–14
|- style="background:#cfc;"
| 30
| August 27
| Connecticut Sun
| L 89–70
| Loyd (18)
| Howard (7)
| Canada (5)
| Alaska Airlines Arena6,258
| 15–15

|- style="background:#cfc;"
| 31
| September 1
| Atlanta Dream
| W 92–75
| Canada (21)
| Tied (8)
| Canada (8)
| Alaska Airlines Arena9,000
| 16–15
|- style="background:#cfc;"
| 32
| September 3
| @ Phoenix Mercury
| W 82–70
| Howard (22)
| Howard (12)
| Canada (10)
| Talking Stick Resort Arena8,724
| 17–15
|- style="background:#fcc;"
| 33
| September 5
| @ Los Angeles Sparks
| L 68–102
| Tied (13)
| Russell (8)
| Howard (4)
| Staples Center10,591
| 17–16
|- style="background:#cfc;"
| 34
| September 8
| @ Dallas Wings
| W 78–64
| Howard (22)
| Howard (9)
| Tied (5)
| College Park Center5,910
| 18–16

Playoffs

|- style="background:#cfc;"
| 1
| September 11
| Minnesota Lynx
| W 84–74
| Canada (26)
| Russell (9)
| Howard (6)
| Angel of the Winds Arena5,011
| 1–0

|- style="background:#fcc;"
| 1
| September 15
| Los Angeles Sparks
| L 69–92
| Howard (20)
| Howard (11)
| Canada (7)
| Staples Center9,081
| 0–1

Awards and honors

Standings

Playoffs

Statistics

Regular season

References

External links
Official Site of the Seattle Storm

Seattle Storm seasons
Seattle
Seattle Storm
Storm